18:15 ab Ostkreuz is a German film. The film showed at the 2006 Berlin International Film Festival.

Cast
Ades Zabel as Karin Hoene / Hürriyet Lachmann
Andreja Schneider als Rosa Brathuhn / Verena Strunzig

References

External links

German comedy films
2000s German-language films
2006 films
Films set in Berlin
2000s German films